Doxford may refer to:

Doxford Park, a suburb of Sunderland, Tyne and Wear, England; also the name of a wooded area of land located within the suburb
Doxford House, mansion in the Silksworth area of Sunderland
Doxford International Business Park in Sunderland
William Doxford & Sons, a British shipbuilding company and maker of marine diesel engines

See also
Duxford